The logo of luxury automaker Ferrari is the Prancing Horse, a prancing black horse on a yellow background.

Description
The logo is generally presented in one of two ways: either as a shield, with the Italian tricolour above the horse and the initials SF ("Scuderia Ferrari") below; or as a rectangle, replacing "SF" with the word "Ferrari" rendered in the company's trademark typeface. The shield is most closely associated with racing vehicles, the rectangle with road vehicles.

History
Enzo Ferrari offered an account of the horse's origins. In his story, after a 1923 victory in Ravenna, the family of Count Francesco Baracca, a deceased flying ace who painted the emblem on his airplane, paid him a visit. Countess Paolina Biancoli, Francesco's mother, suggested that Ferrari adopt the horse as a good luck charm: he accepted the request, and the Prancing Horse was first used by his racing team in 1932, applied to their Alfa Romeo 8C with the addition of a canary yellow background — the "colour of Modena," Enzo's hometown. The rectangular Prancing Horse has been used since 1947, when the Ferrari 125 S — also the first Ferrari car — became the first to wear it.

Baracca himself adopted the horse in tribute to a cavalry regiment he once belonged to, which had used a similar symbol since 1692. Many embellishments to the story circulate, however. One version claims that the horse was originally red, and was only painted black after Baracca's death, in an act of mourning by his squadron mates; in defiance to this detail, the Museo Francesco Baracca has found evidence that the horse was always black. Another version claims that the emblem originated as a kill mark, applied after Baracca shot down a German pilot from Stuttgart, a city whose coat of arms depicts a similar horse. If true, this would make the Prancing Horse distantly related to the horse found on Porsche's logo, itself derived from the arms of Stuttgart. Still others believe that the connection between Baracca and Ferrari is entirely apocryphal, owing to the nine-year interval between the purported meeting and the emblem's adoption, and the paucity of evidence for the story beyond Enzo Ferrari's personal account.

Other users
Fabio Taglioni, an influential engineer for Ducati, applied the same emblem to many of his motorcycles. Similar to Ferrari, he did this in tribute to Francesco Baracca: Taglioni's father had fought alongside the ace in World War I, and the two families remained in friendship with one another afterwards. As Taglioni rose in prominence within Ducati, Francesco's mother, the same woman who gave Enzo Ferrari permission to use the horse, also allowed him to do so. Ducati stopped using the emblem after 1960.

Steinwinter, a specialty automaker from Germany, used a logo nearly identical to Ferrari's, featuring a black prancing horse enclosed inside a shield. Like Porsche, the logo is in fact derived from the arms of Stuttgart.

See also
Identity of Ferrari

References

Ferrari
Coats of arms with horses